This is a list of broadcast television stations that are licensed in the U.S. state of Iowa.

Full-power stations
VC refers to the station's PSIP virtual channel. RF refers to the station's physical RF channel.

Defunct full-power stations 
Channel 17: KGTV - ABC - Des Moines (11/14/1953-4/15/1955)
Channel 21: KVFD-TV - NBC - Fort Dodge (11/23/1953-5/4/1977)
Channel 22: KWWF - Waterloo  (12/1/2002-8/2/2013)
Channel 34: KEFB - Ames (2005-2016)
Channel 40: KDUB-TV (first incarnation) - Dubuque (6/1/1970-10/3/1974)

LPTV stations

Translators

External links
 
  (Directory ceased in 2017)
 Iowa Broadcasters Association
 
 
 
 
 
 
 Iowa TV Markets from Northpine.com

Iowa

Television stations